The Martin diameter is the length of the area bisector of an irregular object in a specified direction of measurement. It is used to measure particle size in microscopy.

See also
 Feret diameter

References

External links
 Martin's diameter, Photonics Dictionary Plus

Microscopy